Basketball at the Friendship Games was contested between 22 and 30 August 1984. Two events (one men's, with eleven teams and one women's, with eight teams) took place at two venues in Moscow, Soviet Union – the CSKA Sports Palace and the Dynamo Sports Palace.

Men's event
Eleven teams were drawn into two groups.

Group A

Results

Group B

Results

Final round

Classification round

Classification 5th–8th

Classification 9th–12th
Because of the odd number of teams, 5th team of Group A (i. e. Finland) was seeded in the ninth place match without playing any second round match.

Final ranking

Women's event
Eight teams competed in a round-robin tournament.

Results

Winning teams' squads

Medal table

See also
 Basketball at the 1984 Summer Olympics

References

Friendship Games
Friendship Games
1984 in Soviet sport
Friendship Games
International basketball competitions hosted by the Soviet Union